Rear Admiral William Smith (died 1756) was a Royal Navy officer who served as Commander-in-Chief of the Jamaica Station.

Naval career
Smith was promoted to post captain on 10 May 1716 on appointment to the command of the sixth-rate HMS Port Mahon. He transferred to the command of the fifth-rate HMS Gosport in August 1720, of the fourth-rate HMS Dartmouth in 1721 and of the fourth-rate HMS York in 1726.
 
Smith served briefly as Commander-in-Chief of the Jamaica Station in 1729 and was promoted to Rear Admiral on 21 July 1747 during his retirement.

References

Sources

 

Royal Navy rear admirals
1756 deaths